Sölden is a municipality in the Ötztal valley of Tyrol, Austria.

Geography
At c. , it is the largest municipality in the country. The population of 3,449 (as of 2003) is outnumbered by tourists, of which 15,000 can be accommodated.   With tourist bed nights running at over two million per year, the municipality is third only to Vienna and Salzburg as an Austrian tourist destination. Sölden has lost some of its former small village charm, but other attractions have been enhanced in recent years.

The Ötztal Glacier Road is the second highest paved road in Europe. It is the access road from Sölden to the Rettenbach glacier and Tiefenbachferner glaciers in the Ötztal Alps.

The English spelling of the town is "Soelden". One may come across websites and directions using this spelling of the town.

History

Population

Settlement

Primitive tools found near present-day Sölden suggest that the region has been settled for thousands of years. Ötzi, a famously well-preserved mummy of a man who lived between 3400 and 3100 BC, was found in the Ötztal Alps near Sölden.
Sölden as we know it today grew out of 20 buildings in the 13th century AD. One of these buildings which still exists today is the Berghof.
A building on the site of the Berghof was first mentioned in 1370. In 1588, the Berghof was listed in the records of St. Petersberg Castle as one of the original farmsteads. The house is now used as accommodation for guests.

Ski resort
Sölden is also a popular ski resort and regularly hosts the first World Cup races of the season; a giant slalom for both men and women is usually scheduled for late October on the Rettenbach glacier.

 Elevation:  (Sölden village) - 
 Lifts: 33 
 Terrain:  total - ( red,  blue,  black,  Skiroute).

References

External links

 Soelden.com - official tourist site
 Ski-Austria - Soelden Skiing

Cities and towns in Imst District
Ski areas and resorts in Austria